The Apache Software Foundation  (ASF) is an American nonprofit corporation (classified as a 501(c)(3) organization in the United States) to support a number of open source software projects. The ASF was formed from a group of developers of the Apache HTTP Server, and incorporated on March 25, 1999. As of 2021, it includes approximately 1000 members.

The Apache Software Foundation is a decentralized open source community of developers. The software they produce is distributed under the terms of the Apache License, a permissive open-source license for free and open-source software (FOSS). The Apache projects are characterized by a collaborative, consensus-based development process and an open and pragmatic software license, which is to say that it allows developers who receive the software freely, to re-distribute it under nonfree terms.  Each project is managed by a self-selected team of technical experts who are active contributors to the project. The ASF is a meritocracy, implying that membership of the foundation is granted only to volunteers who have actively contributed to Apache projects. The ASF is considered a second generation open-source organization, in that commercial support is provided without the risk of platform lock-in.

Among the ASF's objectives are: to provide legal protection to volunteers working on Apache projects; to prevent the Apache brand name from being used by other organizations without permission.

The ASF also holds several ApacheCon conferences each year, highlighting Apache projects and related technology.

History
The history of the Apache Software Foundation is linked to the Apache HTTP Server, development beginning in February 1993. A group of eight developers started working on enhancing the NCSA HTTPd daemon. They came to be known as the Apache Group. On March 25, 1999, the Apache Software Foundation was formed. The first official meeting of the Apache Software Foundation was held on April 13, 1999. The initial members of the Apache Software Foundation consisted of the Apache Group: Brian Behlendorf, Ken Coar, Miguel Gonzales, Mark Cox, Lars Eilebrecht, Ralf S. Engelschall, Roy T. Fielding, Dean Gaudet, Ben Hyde, Jim Jagielski, Alexei Kosut, Martin Kraemer, Ben Laurie, Doug MacEachern, Aram Mirzadeh, Sameer Parekh, Cliff Skolnick, Marc Slemko, William (Bill) Stoddard, Paul Sutton, Randy Terbush and Dirk-Willem van Gulik. After a series of additional meetings to elect board members and resolve other legal matters regarding incorporation, the effective incorporation date of the Apache Software Foundation was set to June 1, 1999.

Co-founder Brian Behlendorf states how the name 'Apache' was chosen: "I suggested the name Apache partly because the web technologies at the time that were launching were being called cyber this or spider that or something on those themes and I was like we need something a little more interesting, a little more romantic, not to be a cultural appropriator or anything like that, I had just seen a documentary about Geronimo and the last days of a Native American tribe called the Apaches, right, who succumbed to the invasion from the West, from the United States, and they were the last tribe to give up their territory and for me that almost romantically represented what I felt we were doing with this web-server project..."

Projects

Apache divides its software development activities into separate semi-autonomous areas called "top-level projects" (formally known as a "Project Management Committee" in the bylaws), some of which have a number of sub-projects. Unlike some other organizations that host FOSS projects, before a project is hosted at Apache it has to be licensed to the ASF with a grant or contributor agreement. In this way, the ASF gains the necessary intellectual property rights for the development and distribution of all its projects.

Board of directors
The Board of Directors of The Apache Software Foundation (ASF) is responsible for management and oversight of the business and affairs of the corporation in accordance with the Bylaws. This includes management of the corporate assets (funds, intellectual property, trademarks, and support equipment), appointment of a President and corporate officers managing the core operations of the ASF, and allocation of corporate resources for the benefit of Apache projects. Technical decision-making authority for every Apache project is assigned to their independent project management committee; the participants in each project provide direction, not the board.
The board is elected annually by the ASF membership.

Since March 17, 2021, the board of directors has been:

 Bertrand Delacretaz
 Roy T. Fielding
 Sharan Foga
 Justin Mclean
 Sam Ruby
 Craig L. Russell
 Roman Shaposhnik
 Sander Striker
 Sheng Wu

See also

 List of Apache Software Foundation projects
 Apache Attic
 Apache Incubator
 Log4Shell
 CNCF
 Linux Foundation

Notes

Further reading
 Wikinomics: How Mass Collaboration Changes Everything (2006); Don Tapscott, Anthony D. Williams.

External links

 
 ApacheCon website
“Trillions and Trillions Served”  Feature documentary by the Apache Software Foundation detailing its history and impact on the open-source software community (2020)

1999 establishments in Maryland
501(c)(3) organizations
 
Free and open-source software organizations
Non-profit organizations based in Maryland
Software companies established in 1999